Boris Mauricio Aravena Chamorro (born 31 July 1982) is a Chilean former footballer who played as a defender. His last club was then Primera B side Coquimbo Unido.

Honours

Club
Curicó Unido
 Tercera División de Chile (1): 2005

Unión San Felipe
 Primera B (1): 2009
 Copa Chile (1): 2009

External links
 
 
 Boris Aravena at Football-Lineups

1982 births
Living people
People from Talca
Chilean footballers
Curicó Unido footballers
Unión San Felipe footballers
Unión La Calera footballers
Cobresal footballers
Deportes Concepción (Chile) footballers
San Luis de Quillota footballers
Coquimbo Unido footballers
Primera B de Chile players
Chilean Primera División players
Association football defenders